Corky II, often referred to as just Corky, is a female captive orca from the A5 Pod of northern resident orcas. At approximately the age of four, Corky was captured from Pender Harbour off the coast of British Columbia on December 11, 1969. She has lived at SeaWorld San Diego in San Diego, California since 1987. As of 2022, she is the oldest and longest kept captive orca.

Early life
Corky was born in 1965. Her mother, designated A23, nicknamed "Stripe", died in 2000. Corky, along with a young unnamed male and a young female later named Patches, were sold to Marineland of the Pacific, in Palos Verdes, California. As of 2022, Corky is the only surviving captured orca from her family group. She is designated A16.

Captivity
Corky II received her name after the park's original orca, Corky I, died in December 1970. Corky was kept with a male named Orky II, also caught in Pender Harbour the year before her own capture. The pair remained together at the park for the next seventeen years and mated. Corky became the first orca to produce offspring in captivity and on February 28, 1977, she gave birth to the first captive calf. However, the infant male failed to nurse and died of pneumonia after just eleven days. Corky and Orky had six more calves but none survived, the oldest, named Kiva, lived just forty-six days. Corky and Orky also appeared in the 1977 film Tentacles. 

In 1987, Corky was sold to SeaWorld and was moved with Orky to the park in San Diego, California. There, she mated with Icelandic male orcas, and both calves died within days of their birth. Orky later bred with other females at SeaWorld and sired two female calves, Orkid and Kayla, who died in 2019. Corky never became pregnant again. In 1988, Orky died three days after the birth of his first daughter. He was the oldest and largest captive orca at the time of his death.

As of 2022, Corky remains at SeaWorld San Diego and lives with eight other orcas.

Incident
In 1989 the dominant female orca, Kandu V, charged at Corky but ruptured an artery in her own jaw during the fight. After a 45-minute hemorrhage, Kandu V died. Her eleven month old daughter, Orkid, was placed with Corky, who acted as a surrogate mother.

Controversy
Corky is the subject of various campaigns by animal rights activists demanding her retirement and release. In 2017, a Canadian orca research organization created a banner from more than 17,000 pieces of artwork that stretched 1.5 miles as a means to promote her freedom. A proposed 40 acre sea sanctuary located off Hanson Island in British Columbia has been proposed for her relocation, but SeaWorld remains resistant, arguing Corky would not survive.

See also
 List of individual cetaceans

Further reading
 Ford, John K.B.; Ellis, Graeme M.; & Balcomb, Kenneth C. (2000). Killer Whales (2nd ed.). UBC Press. .
 Hoyt, Erich. (1990). Orca: The Whale Called Killer (3rd ed.). London: Robert Hale Limited. .
 Morton, Alexandra. (2002). Listening to Whales: What the Orcas Have Taught Us New York: Ballantine Publishing Group. .
 Patryla, Jim. (2005). A Photographic Journey Back To Marineland of the Pacific Lulu Publishing. .

References

1965 animal births
Individual orcas